Philip Bryan Wormald (born 4 May 1963) is a former English cricketer. Wormald was a right-handed batsman who bowled right-arm medium-fast. He was born in Sutton-in-Ashfield, Nottinghamshire.

Wormald made his debut for Shropshire in the 1987 Minor Counties Championship against the Somerset Second XI. Wormald played Minor counties cricket for Shropshire from 1987 to 1991, which included 32 Minor Counties Championship appearances and 8 MCCA Knockout Trophy appearances. He made his List A debut against Hampshire in the 1988 NatWest Trophy. He made 3 further List A appearances, the last of which came against Leicestershire in the 1991 NatWest Trophy. In his 4 List A matches, he scored 42 runs at an average of 14.00, with a high score of 16. With the ball he took 5 wickets at a bowling average of 31.40, with best figures of 2/85.

References

External links
Philip Wormald at ESPNcricinfo
Philip Wormald at CricketArchive

1963 births
Living people
Cricketers from Sutton-in-Ashfield
English cricketers
Shropshire cricketers